Richard N. Longenecker (July 21, 1930 - June 7, 2021) was a prominent New Testament scholar.  He held teaching positions at Wheaton College and Graduate School (1954-57; 1960-63); Trinity Evangelical Divinity School (1963-72); Wycliffe College (Toronto, 1972-94, from which he received an honorary doctorate in 1996); University of St. Michael’s College (Toronto, 1976-78); and McMaster Divinity College (Hamilton, 1994-2001). His education included B.A. and M.A. degrees from Wheaton College, and a Ph.D. from New College in the University of Edinburgh.  

Longenecker is the author of numerous books and over fifty published articles in scholarly and professional journals. In Paul Apostle of Liberty (1964), he proposed views that would only later become mainstream in academic scholarship — such as the covenantal character of Jewish obedience to the Torah, and the importance to Paul’s theology of the phrase “the faithfulness of Christ.” Other important books include his commentary on Galatians (1990), Introducing Romans (2011) and his commentary on Romans (2016).  

In 1994, a Festschrift was published in his honor. Gospel in Paul: Studies on Corinthians, Galatians and Romans for Richard N. Longenecker included contributions from Linda Belleville, Terry Donaldson, James Dunn, Gordon Fee, Walter Hansen, John Hurd, Margaret Mitchell, Peter Richardson, Klyne Snodgrass, and N.T. Wright.

Works

Books
   
_ (1978). The Melchizedek Argument of Hebrews: A Study in the Development and Circumstantial Expression of New Testament Thought. Unity and Diversity in New Testament Theology. George Guelich and Robert A. Ladd (eds.) Eerdmans Press. 
___ (1977) The “Faith Of Abraham” Theme In Paul, James And Hebrews: A Study In The Circumstantial Nature Of New Testament Teaching. Journal of the Evangelical Theological Society.  JETS 20:3 (Sep 1977)  
__ (1974) "The Obedience of Christ in the Theology of the Early Church" in Reconciliation and Hope: Essays in honor of L .Morris. Robert Banks (ed.)

Articles

External links
https://dartefuneralhome.com/tribute/details/7884/Richard-Longenecker/obituary.html
https://www.christianitytoday.com/ct/2021/june-web-only/richard-longenecker-tribute-died-new-testament-paul-judaism.html
https://eerdword.com/richard-longenecker/

1930 births
2021 deaths
New Testament scholars
Wheaton College (Illinois) alumni
Academic staff of the University of Toronto
Alumni of the University of Edinburgh
People from Mishawaka, Indiana